The International Network for Social Network Analysis (INSNA) is a professional academic association of researchers and practitioners of social network analysis. Members have interests in social networks as a new theoretical paradigm, in methodological developments, and in a variety of applications of different types of social networks approaches, social network software, and social networking.

History
INSNA was founded in 1977 by Barry Wellman, a sociologist. A key function of the organization was to provide a sense of identity for a set of researchers who were widely dispersed geographically and across scientific disciplines. Wellman served as "coordinator" of INSNA until 1988, when he passed the baton to Al Wolfe, an anthropologist at the University of South Florida. Wolfe in turn passed the leadership to Steve Borgatti, who served from 1993 to 1999. Borgatti incorporated INSNA as a legal entity, creating bylaws and establishing the positions of President, Vice-President and Treasurer. A full chronology of INSNA leadership is as follows:

Shortly after INSNA was founded, Linton C. Freeman founded the association's flagship journal, Social Networks, in 1978. In 1981, the annual Sunbelt Conference was founded by Al Wolfe and H. Russel Bernard. Initially, the conference was independent of the association, but was brought under INSNA's auspices by Steve Borgatti in the 1990s.

As of 2018, INSNA has approximately 1,000 active members, while the SOCNET listserv has about 3700 subscribers.

As well as publishing a triannual journal Connections on the subject, INSNA also:

Runs SOCNET, a listserv mailing-list for the subject.
Hosts the International Sunbelt Social Network Conference annually. See list below.
Facilitates regional and specialized conferences.
Publishes a quarterly journal, Social Networks.
Publishes the online Journal of Social Structure, irregular periodicity.
Provides links to researchers around the world.
Provides raw data.

Sunbelt Conference
The official conference of the association is the Sunbelt Conference, held annually in a wide variety of international locations. The first Sunbelt conference was organised by Alvin Wolfe and H. Russell Bernard in Tampa, FL. Initially, it was decreed to alternate US coasts, in order to spread travel costs on the part of participants from different regions. However, in 1994, it was decided to incorporate the European network conference, which had been held in parallel with Sunbelt. Starting 1995, Sunbelt observed a 3-year rotation of Europe, west coast, and east coast. Starting with the 2nd Sunbelt, Sunbelt featured a Keynote address by a prominent member of the community. In the 1990s, the keynote speakers were also recognized with the Georg Simmel Distinguished Career Award.

See also
Social network
Social network analysis software
Dynamic Network Analysis

References

Print
Freeman, Linton C. (2004) The Development of Social Network Analysis: A Study in the Sociology of Science. Vancouver: Empirical Press. .
Barry Wellman, “Networking Network Analysts: How INSNA (the International Network for Social Network Analysis) Came to Be.” Connections 23, 1 (Summer, 2000): 20-31.

External links
INSNA website.

Social network analysis
Social sciences organizations
Organizations established in 1977